Zhuhui Stadium (also Zhuhai Stadium) is a multi-purpose stadium in Zhuhai, China.  It is currently used mostly for football matches.  The stadium holds 35,000 spectators.  It opened in 1998.

Macau national football team were forced to play the second leg of their FIFA World Cup Qatar 2022 and AFC Asian Cup 2023 Preliminary Joint Qualification tie against Sri Lanka match at the Zhuhai Sports Center Stadium in neighbour Zhuhai due to ongoing refurbishment work at their regular Estadio Campo Desportivo home. Macau won the match 1-0.

References 

Football venues in China
Multi-purpose stadiums in China
Sports venues in Guangdong